The Willow Fire was a wildfire that burned in the Ventana Wilderness in Monterey County, California, in the United States as part of the 2021 California wildfire season. The fire started on June 17, 2021, burned , and was fully contained on July 12, 2021.

Events

June 
The Willow Fire was first reported at around 8:00 pm PT on June 17, 2021.

Cause 
The cause of the fire is under investigation and is currently unknown.

Containment 
On July 12, 2021, the Willow Fire reached 100% containment.

Impact

Closures and Evacuations 
The Willow Fire forced evacuations in the areas around Tassajara Road and Arroyo Seco Road in the Ventana Wilderness of the Los Padres National Forest. Various campgrounds, including the China Camp Campground and Arroyo Seco Campground, were forced to close.

The fire threatened the Tassajara Zen Mountain Center, a buddhist monastery located deep in the mountains along the Big Sur coast. Although much of the monastery was evacuated, a number of trained firefighters from the monastery known as "fire monks" stayed behind to help defend the monastery from the fire. The fire monks cleared brush around the monastery and ran a sprinkler system they called "Dharma rain," while also coordinating with local authorities.

See also 

 2021 California wildfires
 List of California wildfires

References 

2021 California wildfires
June 2021 events in the United States
Wildfires in Monterey County, California